Don Agustín Fernando Muñoz y Sánchez (4 May 180811 September 1873), 1st Duke of Riánsares, 1st Marquis of San Agustín, 1st Duc de Montmorot, was the second and morganatic husband of Maria Christina, Regent of Spain.

Early life
Muñoz was born at Tarancón in the Province of Cuenca, New Castile. He was the second son of Juan Antonio Muñoz y Funes (1779-1849), later created Count of Retamoso and his wife, Eusebia Maria Sánchez y Ortega (b. 1781). His paternal grandmother Eugenia Dorotea de Funes y Martinez (b. 1753) was a nursemaid of Infanta Carlota Joaquina, while his father was the keeper of an estanco or office for the sale of the tobacco of the government monopoly.

Marriage to the Regent of Spain
Muñoz enlisted in the royal bodyguard, and he attracted the attention of Maria Christina. According to one account, he distinguished himself by stopping the runaway horses of her carriage; according to another, he only picked up her handkerchief; a third and scandalous explanation of his fortune has been given. Maria Christina's husband, King Ferdinand VII of Spain died on 28 September 1833, and on 29 December 1833 she and Muñoz were privately married.

If Maria Christina had officially made the marriage public, she would have forfeited the regency; but her relations with Muñoz were perfectly well known within the Spanish court. When on 13 August 1836 the soldiers on duty at the summer palace La Granja mutinied and forced the regent to grant a constitution, it was generally, though wrongly, believed that they overcame her reluctance by seizing Muñoz, whom they called her guapo, or fancy man, and threatening to shoot him. In 1840 Maria Christina found her position intolerable; she renounced the regency and left Spain with Muñoz.  In 1842 Maria Christina purchased the Château de Malmaison as their residence.  In 1843, on the overthrow of General Baldomero Espartero they returned to Spain.

Public recognition of the marriage
In 1844, Muñoz's stepdaughter Queen Isabella II was declared to be of age.  On 23 June 1844 Isabella gave to Muñoz the title duque de Riánsares, to which was attached a Grandeza de España; the title came from the river Ánsares, near Muñoz's birthplace in Tarancón. On 12 October 1844 Isabella gave official consent to the marriage between her mother and Muñoz, and it was publicly performed.  In 1846 Isabella made Muñoz a Knight of the Golden Fleece. On 30 May 1846 she gave Muñoz a second title, marqués de San Agustín. Muñoz was made a Captain General, the highest rank in the Spanish Army.  In 1847 Louis Philippe, King of the French, gave Muñoz the title duc de Montmorot; he also invested Muñoz with the Grand Cross of the Légion d'honneur.

Until driven from Spain with Maria Christina by the revolutionary movement of 1854, Muñoz is credibly reported to have applied himself to making a large fortune out of railway concessions and by judicious stock exchange speculations. Of political ambitions he had none. All authorities agree that he was not only good-looking, but kind and well-bred.

Muñoz died in 1873, five years before his wife, at his home, Villa Mon Désir in Le Havre, near Sainte-Adresse, in France. His remains are buried in the crypt of the Santuario de Nuestra Señora de Riánsares, several kilometres outside Tarancón.

Children
Muñoz and Maria Christina had several children:
 María Amparo Muñoz, 1st Countess of Vista Alegre (17 November 183419 August 1864) married Prince Władysław Czartoryski (1828–1894)
 Maria de los Milagros Muñoz, 1st Marchioness of Castillejo (8 November 18359 July 1903) married to Filippo del Drago, Principe di Mazzano e d'Antuni (1824–1913).
 Agustín Muñoz, 1st Duke of Tarancón (15 March 183715 July 1855)
Fernando Muñoz, 2nd Duke of Tarancón and Riansares (27 April 18387 December 1910) married to Eladia Bernaldo de Quirós y Gonzalez de Cienfuegos (1839–1909).
 María Cristina Muñoz, Marchioness of La Isabella (19 April 184020 December 1921) married to Jose Maria Bernaldo de Quirós y Gonzalez de Cienfuegos, Marques de Campo Sagrado (1840–1911).
 Juan Muñoz, Count of Recuerdo (29 August 18442 April 1863)
 José Muñoz, Count of Gracia (21 December 184617 December 1863)

References

Further reading
 Garrido Gallego, Jesús. Datos biográficos y memoria de don Agustín Fernando Muñoz, Duque de Riánsares, esposo de su majestad la reina Doña María Cristina de Borbón (Tarancón, 1808-El Havre, 1873). Madrid: Nuevo Milenio, 2008.

1808 births
1873 deaths
101
Knights of the Golden Fleece
Morganatic spouses
Grandees of Spain